Božidar Đurašević (26 April 1933 – 23 January 2022) was a Serbian chess player. Đurašević became International Master in 1957 and represented Yugoslavia at the Chess Olympiad 1956 and 1958.

References

External links

1933 births
2022 deaths
Serbian chess players
Yugoslav chess players
Chess International Masters
Sportspeople from Belgrade